was a Japanese manufacturer of cameras, camera accessories, photocopiers, fax machines, and laser printers. It made the first integrated autofocus 35 mm SLR camera system. In 1931, the company adopted its final name, an acronym for "Mechanism, Instruments, Optics, and Lenses by Tashima".

In 2003, Minolta merged with Konica to form Konica Minolta. On 19 January 2006, Konica Minolta announced that it was leaving the camera and photo business, and that it would sell a portion of its SLR camera business to Sony as part of its move to pull completely out of the business of selling cameras and photographic film.

History

Milestones

 
1928:  establishes Nichi-Doku Shashinki Shōten ("Japanese-German photo company," the precursor of Minolta Co., Ltd.).
1929: Marketed the company's first camera, the "Nifcarette" (ニフカレッテ).
1937: The Minolta Flex is Japan's second twin-lens reflex camera (after the Prince Flex by Neumann & Heilemann).
1947: Introduction of the long lived 35mm rangefinder camera Minolta-35
1958: The Minolta SR-2 is Minolta's first single-lens reflex camera.
1959: The Minolta SR-1.
1962: John Glenn takes a specially modified Ansco-logoed Minolta Hi-Matic camera into space aboard Friendship 7. The company changes its name to Minolta Camera Co., Ltd.
1966: The Minolta SR-T 101 SLR camera is one of the first with TTL (through-the-lens) full aperture  light metering. The first is Topcon RE Super from 1963.
1972: Minolta signs an agreement to cooperate with Leica in SLR development; 
1973: The Minolta CL is the first fruit of this agreement.
1976: The Leica R3 is introduced. Minolta produces the R3, R4, and R5 models in the Leica R series. Subsequent cameras are built in Germany by Leica themselves.
1977: The Minolta XD-11 (N. America only, XD-7 worldwide) is introduced, the world's first 'multi mode' SLR offering M, A, S modes, with a 'Program override' in S mode effected by a computer chip, the world's first Program mode. This same year, Minolta also introduced the Minolta XG series starting with the Minolta XG-7.
1981: Implementation of Minolta's invention and patent of TTL (through-the-lens) OTF (off-the-film) exposure metering: the Minolta CLE is the first 35mm rangefinder camera to feature TTL metering and aperture priority autoexposure. The Minolta X-700 manual-focus SLR is introduced; this model is sold until 1999 and is enormously successful.  The Minolta XD-11 (Model E) is the first Minolta product branded with an updated logo (in caps), which was in use until the 2003 merger with Konica.
1985: The Minolta Maxxum 7000 Alpha Mount Camera becomes the world's first autofocus 35mm SLR with in-camera autofocus motor.
1987: Honeywell files lawsuit against Minolta for patent infringement over autofocus technologies.
1991: Minolta's autofocus design was found to infringe on the patents of Honeywell, a U.S. corporation. After protracted litigation, in 1991 Minolta was ordered to pay Honeywell damages, penalties, trial costs, and other expenses in a final amount of $127.6 million 
1992: Minolta settles out of court with Honeywell.
1994: The company changes its name to Minolta Co., Ltd. because it no longer is primarily a camera company.
1995: Introduction of the Minolta RD-175, a 1.75-megapixel digital SLR camera.
1996: The Minolta Vectis camera is a completely new SLR system designed around the Advanced Photo System (APS) film format.
1998: The Minolta Maxxum 9 autofocus SLR is introduced. This system is targeted toward the professional photographer and has many features not duplicated by the competition.
2003: DiMAGE A1 introduced world's first sensor-based anti-shake, and was the final Minolta product branded prior to the Konica Minolta merger. 
2004: Minolta and Konica officially merge to become Konica Minolta Holdings, Inc.
2005: The company announces joint venture with Sony on CCD and CMOS technologies.
2006: Konica Minolta announces it is discontinuing all film and digital camera production, ending a 78-year history as a camera manufacturer. Final models released were Dimage X1 and Z6. Konica Minolta Photo Image, Inc.'s (the camera business portion of Konica Minolta) assets regarding digital camera technology are transferred to Sony for continued development started from the joint venture.

Early cameras

Relying heavily on imported German technology, Nichi-Doku turned out their first product, a bellows camera called the Nifcarette, in March 1929. By 1937, the company reorganized as Chiyoda Kogaku Seikō, K.K. (Chiyoda Optics and Fine Engineering, Ltd.) and built the first Japanese-made twin-lens reflex camera, the Minoltaflex, based on the German Rolleiflex.

In 1947, the Minolta-35 was introduced. It is based on the Leica rangefinder camera concept with the 39mm screw lens-mount. It uses the standard 35mm film in cassettes. The standard lens is the Super Rokkor 1:2.8 50mm.

In 1950, Minolta developed a planetarium projector, the first-ever made in Japan, beginning the company's connection to astronomical optics. John Glenn took a Minolta Hi-Matic rangefinder 35 mm camera aboard the spacecraft Friendship 7 in 1962, and in 1968, Apollo 8 orbited the moon with a Minolta Space Meter aboard.

In the late 1950s and 1960s, Minolta competed in the medium-format roll film camera market with the Autocord series of TLR (twin-lens reflex) cameras.

Single-lens reflex cameras
In 1958, Minolta introduced its SR-2 single lens reflex (SLR) 35mm camera which was equipped with a bayonet mount and instant return mirror. In 1966 Minolta introduced the SR-T line which included TTL metering. Although well-made and widely regarded as some of the most innovative SLR cameras of their time, Minolta cameras were not as robust as competing Nikon models. Minolta SR/SRT design used sleeve bushings instead of bearings on its focal plane spindles and had greater tolerances between working parts. This occasionally caused problems in very cold weather or with extremely high levels of use. Minolta SLRs also lacked important professional features such as a motor drive, removable pentaprism, and removable back. Minolta cameras appealed to amateur photographers with their lower prices and high-quality optics.

From the late 1950s through the 1980s, Minolta was the first Japanese manufacturer to introduce a bayonet lens mount rather than a screw mount; and the first manufacturer to introduce multimode metering. They also introduced the first commercially successful autofocus SLR line with the Maxxum series.

In 1972, Minolta drew up a formal cooperation agreement with Leitz. Leitz needed expertise in camera body electronics, and Minolta felt that they could learn from Leitz's optical expertise. Tangible results of this cooperation were the Leica CL/Minolta CL, an affordable rangefinder camera to supplement the Leica M range. The Leica CL was built by Minolta to Leica specifications. Other results were the Leica R3, which was in fact the Minolta XE-1 with a Leica lens mount, viewfinder, and spot metering system, and the Leica R4 was based on the Minolta XD-11. Additionally, five Minolta lenses were repackaged as Leica R lenses: the Minolta 24/2.8 MC Rokkor-X optics are found in the Leica 24/2.8 Elmarit-R, and similarly for the Minolta 35-70/3.5, 75-200/4.5, 70-210/4, and 16/2.8.

First "program" focal plane shutter 35mm SLR: the XD-11
In 1977, Minolta introduced the XD-11, the first multimode 35 mm compact SLR to include both aperture and shutter priority in a single body. It was also the first camera to employ a computerised chip, which in shutter priority mode overrode the chosen speed if necessary to give a correct exposure, thus offering the first-ever 'programmed mode'. The XD-11 was the last attempt by Minolta to enter the professional and semiprofessional 35 mm SLR market until the Maxxum 9 in 1998. Elements of the XD-11 design (called the XD-7 in Europe) were utilized by Leitz for the Leica R4 camera.

The final manual-focus 35mm SLR cameras: the X-700 series
Minolta continued to offer 35 mm manual focus SLR cameras in its X-370, X-570, and X-700 from 1981, but slowly repositioned its cameras to appeal to a broader market. Minolta decided to abandon the high level of design and parts specifications of its earlier XD/XE line. The new amateur-level X-570, X-700, and related models offered additional program and metering features designed to appeal to newer photographers, at a lower cost. The advanced vertical metal shutter design of the older cameras was rejected in favor of a cheaper horizontal cloth-curtain shutter, reducing flash sync to a slow 1/60th second. Further cost savings were made internally, where some operating components were changed from metal to plastic.

The first version of the X-370, the chrome version that was made in Japan, was a rugged, all-metal camera that sometimes had greater appeal than the “plasticky” X-570, X-700, or later black versions of the X-370 (known as the X-7A) to photographers who place a premium on build quality.

As Minolta's autofocus Maxxums were proving successful, Minolta invested fewer resources in its manual focus line as time progressed.

Compact 35mm film cameras

Minolta entered the highly competitive 35mm compact camera market in the 1980s and transitioned from older rangefinder designs to "point-and-shoot" (P&S) electronic autofocus/autowind cameras. Minolta, like other major manufacturers faced with low-cost competition from elsewhere in Asia, found it difficult to build quality P&S cameras at a cost the consumer was willing to pay, and was forced to offshore production, gradually redesigning successive cameras to reduce cost and maintain profit margins.

Autofocus SLRs

Minolta purchased the patent rights to autofocus lens technology from Leica Camera in the 1970s. In 1985, Minolta introduced a new line of autofocus (AF) SLR cameras. In North America, they used the name Maxxum; in Europe, the cameras were called Dynax; and in Japan, they were named Alpha. They were Minolta's first line of automatic focus SLR cameras, and the first commercially successful autofocus SLRs the world had seen.

Minolta's marketing agency of record, The Manhattan-based William Esty Company branded the Minolta Maxxum, which was named by Creative Director George Morin. The round Minolta logo was developed by Art Director Herbert Clark with internationally renowned designer Saul Bass. The Minolta Freedom line of autofocus compacts were also branded at The William Esty Company, and named by Senior Copywriter Niels Peter Olsen. The Minolta Freedom line also included the Minolta Talker, the first point & shoot camera to incorporate a voice-chip that assisted with autofocus and flash operations. As a result of their innovations, the products that Minolta launched with The William Esty Company increased their camera sales from third, behind Canon & Nikon, to first in the U.S. marketplace.

With the Maxxum line, the heavy duty metal bodies of earlier Minoltas were abandoned in favor of lighter and less expensive plastics. The Maxxum 7000, the most popular of the new Maxxums, introduced the innovation of arrow buttons for setting aperture and shutter speed, rather than a shutter speed dial on the body and an aperture ring on the lens. That way, the only control necessary on the lens is the manual focus ring (plus the zoom ring in the case of zoom lenses).

The Maxxum 7000 had two 8-bit CPUs and six integrated circuits. A circuit on the lens relayed aperture information to the camera body, and the motor for autofocus was contained within the camera body. An LCD showed aperture, shutter speed, and frame count, while an infrared beam counted sprocket holes when advancing the film from frame to frame (this prevents the use of infrared film). The 7000 had TTL phase-detection focusing and metering, autoexposure, and predictive autofocus. All Maxxum cameras use the Minolta A-mount; earlier manual-focus Minolta SR-mount lenses are incompatible with the new AF cameras.

Unfortunately for Minolta, its autofocus design was found to infringe on the patents of Honeywell, a U.S. corporation. After protracted litigation, in 1991 Minolta was ordered to pay Honeywell damages, penalties, trial costs, and other expenses in a final amount of $127.6 million.

After the 4-digit Maxxum i line, which included the 3000i, 5000i, 7000i, and 8000i, came the 1-digit Maxxum xi line; followed by the 3-digit si line; the 1-digit line without letters (Alpha/Dynax/Maxxum 3, 4, 5, 7, 9); and finally, the Maxxum 50  (Dynax 40) and Maxxum 70 (Dynax 60).

APS format cameras
Minolta also invested in APS (Advanced Photo System) film-format cameras, most notably with the Vectis line of SLR cameras beginning in 1996.  APS later proved to be a technological dead end, as the cameras did not sell as hoped. Digital photography was entering the marketplace, and Minolta eventually discontinued all APS camera production.

Other developments

Minolta introduced features that became standard in all brands a few years later. Standardized features that were first introduced on Minolta models included multisensor light metering coupled to multiple AF sensors, automatic flash balance system, wireless TTL flash control, TTL-controlled full-time flash sync, and speedy front and rear wheels for shutter and aperture control. Special features introduced by Minolta are interactive LCD viewfinder display, setup memory, expansion program cards (discontinued), eye-activated startup, and infrared frame counter.

Merger with Konica

In an effort to strengthen market share and acquire additional assets in film, film cameras, and optical equipment, Minolta merged with another long-time Japanese camera manufacturer, Konica Ltd., in 2003. The new corporation was called Konica Minolta Ltd.

Until Konica Minolta announced their withdrawal plan in 2006, they made Maxxum/Dynax digital and film-based cameras (retaining the different names in the different markets), improving the design while maintaining the basic concepts. The Maxxum 4 is a low-priced 35 mm SLR with an A-type bayonet mount, built-in flash, autoexposure, predictive autofocus, electronically controlled vertical-traverse focal plane shutter, and through-the-lens (TTL) phase-detection focusing and metering. In advertising literature, Minolta claimed that the Maxxum 4 was the most compact 35 mm AF SLR, and the second fastest at autofocusing, while the Maxxum 5 was the fastest at autofocusing.  These cameras were, however, intended for the consumer end of the market.

Minolta made one last attempt to enter the amateur and professional market with the Maxxum (Dynax) 9 in 1998, followed by the Maxxum 7 in 2000, which used a full LCD readout on the rear of the camera. Though well received by the photographic press, the 7 and 9 did not sell to expectations or achieve any significant breakthrough with their intended customer base, who had largely gravitated to the Canon or Nikon brands. All of these cameras were eventually discontinued in favor of the less-expensive Maxxum 50 and 70, which were sold under the Minolta name until 2006, when Konica Minolta ceased production of all film cameras.

Digital cameras

Minolta had a line of digital point-and-shoot cameras to compete in the digital photography market. Their DiMAGE line included digital cameras and imaging software as well as film scanners.

Minolta created a new category of "bridge cameras," with the introduction of the DiMAGE 7. Designed for use by people familiar with 35mm single-lens reflex (SLR) cameras but without the added cost or complication of interchangeable lenses or optical reflex viewfinders, the DiMAGE incorporated many of the features of a higher-level film camera with the simplicity of smaller compact digicams. The camera had a traditional zoom ring and focus ring on the lens barrel and was equipped with an electronic viewfinder (EVF) rather than the direct optical reflex view of an SLR. It added other features such as a histogram, and the cameras were compatible with Minolta's flashes for modern film SLRs.

However, the DiMAGE 7 (including the DiMAGE A1, A2, and A200) and similar bridge cameras were not really adequate substitutes for professional SLR cameras, and initially there were many reports of slow autofocus speed and various malfunctions (this surfaced when a Sony-designed CCD chip would malfunction, rendering the camera useless. Minolta, however, issued a CCD alert and fixed faulty units free of charge; after Konica Minolta's withdrawal from the photo business, Sony took over the CCD alert until the warranty repair service was terminated in 2010). Minolta later innovated in this line by being the first manufacturer to integrate a mechanical antishake system (Minolta's antishake is based inside the camera body as opposed to the camera lens, common with Canon EF and Nikon AF lenses).

In January 2002, Minolta again created a new category of camera, introducing the Minolta DiMAGE X, an ultracompact digital with a 3x folded zoom lens. With the folded approach, no moving parts of the lens are external to the camera. Instead, a 45-degree mirror bounces light to a conventional zoom lens safely tucked inside the camera body. Fast startup times are one potential benefit of this design (since nothing needs to extend), but slow focus and shutter lag times marred the advantage of this innovation.

According to a press release by Konica Minolta they "Konica Minolta Photo Imaging Inc. ceased its Camera Business Operations as of 31 March 2006, and ceased the entire customer services for Konica Minolta cameras and related products as of 31 December 2010"

As of January 1, 2017, Minolta digital cameras are exclusively manufactured under license by Elite Brands Inc in the United States.

Digital SLRs

Although Minolta had launched their first digital SLR system as early as 1995, the RD-175 — a 3 sensor (3 x 0.38 megapixel) camera based on the Maxxum 500si — was never successful, and in 1998, it was superseded by the Minolta Dimâge RD 3000, a 3-megapixel DSLR based on the Minolta V-mount of Minolta's APS format SLR camera line, which was equally unsuccessful and short-lived.

While Minolta was the inventor of the modern integrated AF SLR, it took Konica Minolta a long time to enter the digital SLR market, a delay that may have proved fatal. Konica Minolta was the last of the large camera manufacturers to launch a digital SLR camera (Maxxum/Dynax 5D and 7D) using the 35 mm AF mount.  During July 2005, KM and Sony negotiated on a joint development of a new line of DSLR cameras,  where it was believed that Konica Minolta and Sony would market their DSLR line to the masses (much like the joint marketing and development of Pentax and Samsung K10/GX10 DSLRs).

On 19 January 2006, KM announced that all DSLR production would continue under Sony's management; DSLR camera assets were transferred to Sony during the Konica Minolta withdrawal phase until March 31, 2006, where technical support for these cameras (primarily Konica Minolta's other digital cameras) was assumed by Sony, who announced the first Konica Minolta-based Sony SLR — the Alpha A100 — on June 5, 2006. Sony continued the manufacture of DSLRs using Minolta technology until 2010 when the company phased out DSLRs for its SLT system but retained the Minolta A-mount.

Timeline

See also
 Rokkor
 Konica Minolta
 Laboratory equipment
 List of Minolta products
 Sony α Sony Alpha DSLR

References

Bibliography
 Photoxels.com. Brief History of Minolta. Retrieved on 2005-11-29 from https://web.archive.org/web/20060206183204/http://www.photoxels.com/history_minolta.html.
 Sony Corporation announced a new brand for digital Single Lens Reflex (SLR) cameras which Konica Minolta Photo Imaging, Inc. has developed.

External links

 
Konica Minolta
Photography companies of Japan
Electronics companies of Japan
Electronic calculator companies
Computer printer companies
Defunct companies of Japan
Defunct photography companies
Defunct defense companies of Japan
Manufacturing companies established in 1928
Manufacturing companies disestablished in 2003
Optics manufacturing companies
Lens manufacturers
Japanese companies disestablished in 2003
Japanese companies established in 1928
2003 mergers and acquisitions
Cameras